The Albany-Colonie Diamond Dogs were an independent baseball league team based in Albany, New York from 1995 to 2002. The team played at Heritage Park in Colonie. The Diamond Dogs competed in the Northeast League from 1995–98 and then in the Northern League when the two leagues merged prior to the 1999 season. The Diamond Dogs won the Northern League Championship in 1999. Their mascot was "Homer the Heritage Hound", a dog named for Heritage Park. Due to financial woes and competition from the new Tri-City ValleyCats, the Diamond Dogs folded after the 2002 season.

External links
Photographs of Heritage Park, former home of the Albany-Colonie Diamond Dogs - Rochester Area Ballparks
NL Fan Page

Colonie, New York
Northern League (baseball, 1993–2010) teams
Sports in Albany County, New York
Defunct baseball teams in New York (state)
Baseball teams disestablished in 2002
Defunct independent baseball league teams
Professional baseball teams in New York (state)
Baseball teams established in 1995